Huberia brounii is a species of ant in the genus Huberia, endemic to New Zealand.

Taxonomy 
Huberia brounii was described in 1895 by Auguste Forel from a single queen collected in Rotorua.

Etymology 
The species name "brounii" refers to Thomas Broun who collected the holotype.

Distribution and habitat 
Huberia brounii is endemic to New Zealand. The species is widespread throughout both the North Island and the South Island in native forests. Like Huberia striata, it likely has a preference for Nothofagus dominated forests.

See also
Huberia striata, the single other species of the genus

References

External links

Myrmicinae
Ants of New Zealand
Insects described in 1895
Endemic fauna of New Zealand
Hymenoptera of New Zealand
Endemic insects of New Zealand